The Military ranks of North Korea are the military insignia used by the Korean People's Army. Due to the close military cooperation, North Korean ranks are inspired by the Soviet ranks system.

Special ranks

Commissioned officer ranks
The rank insignia of commissioned officers.

Other ranks
The rank insignia of non-commissioned officers and enlisted personnel.

See also
 Comparative military ranks of Korea
 Military ranks of South Korea

Notes

References

External links
 

Korea, North
Military ranks of North Korea